The All-Party Parliamentary Carbon Monoxide Group (APPCOG) is an official All-Party Parliamentary Group of the UK Parliament, co-chaired by Barry Sheerman MP and Baroness Finlay of Llandaff. The group exists to tackle carbon monoxide (CO) poisoning in the UK, improve government policy around CO safety, and raise public awareness of the threat posed by toxic CO gas.

Alongside the co-chairs, the APPCOG has 8 Parliamentary officers from across the Labour, Conservative, Liberal Democrat, Scottish National, and Democratic Unionist parties. Its official entry on the Houses of Parliament register can be found on the APPG Register.

Its secretariat services are provided by Policy Connect, an independent not-for-profit think tank based in London.

History 
The APPCOG, originally named the All-Party Parliamentary Gas Safety Group, was first established to promote awareness of CO poisoning and provide a forum for Parliamentarians, civil servants, industry representatives, charities and emergency services to share information and collaborate in order to improve gas safety.

In July 2012, the group was renamed to the All-Party Parliamentary Carbon Monoxide Group, which better reflected how CO can be produced by a variety of fuels, not just conventional gas.

Events, Research and Campaigning 

The APPCOG holds regular events in Parliament, designed to bring together relevant stakeholders and discuss key issues within the field of carbon monoxide safety.

The APPCOG also conducts research and produces evidence-based reports designed to advise government departments on policy making around CO safety, with a particular focus on the Ministry of Housing, Communities and Local Government, the Department for Work and Pensions, and the Department for Business, Energy and Industrial Strategy.

Preventing Carbon Monoxide Poisoning 

In October 2011, the APPCOG produced Preventing Carbon Monoxide Poisoning, which compiled evidence collected across a six-month inquiry and set a national strategy to eradicate CO poisoning through preventative measures such as providing CO alarms.

Carbon Monoxide: From Awareness to Action 

In April 2014, the APPCOG announced it was undertaking a follow-up to the 2011 Inquiry, including a focus on behavioural insights and nudge theory. In January 2015, the ensuing report - Carbon Monoxide: From Awareness to Action - recommended a more targeted strategy for raising awareness of CO in order to reduce deaths and injuries.

Carbon Monoxide Poisoning: Saving lives, advancing treatment 
In October 2017, the APPCOG's medical subgroup COMed published Carbon Monoxide Poisoning: Saving lives, advancing treatment. This report brought together a range of medical experts and made over twenty recommendations to improve the diagnosis and treatment of CO poisoning.

Carbon Monoxide Alarms: Tenants safe and secure in their homes 
In November 2017, the APPCOG released Carbon Monoxide Alarms: Tenants safe and secure in their homes. The report advocated that landlords should be required to install CO alarms in all properties with a fuel-burning appliance.

Parliamentary Members

See also 
 All-Party Parliamentary Group
 Carbon Monoxide
 Carbon monoxide poisoning
Policy Connect

External links 
 APPCOG official website
Policy Connect official website

References

Air pollution in the United Kingdom
Air pollution organizations
All-Party Parliamentary Groups
Carbon monoxide
Natural gas industry in the United Kingdom
Natural gas organizations
Natural gas safety